Louth by-election may refer to one of three parliamentary by-elections held in the British House of Commons constituency of Louth in Lincolnshire:

1920 Louth by-election
1921 Louth by-election
1969 Louth by-election

See also
Louth, Lincolnshire (UK Parliament constituency)